The Jetboard was an early powered longboard surfboard.  It is one of the earliest, if not the earliest motorized surfboard, produced from 1965 to 1968. The original designer was a former engineer from Boeing Aircraft. It was designed to use an aircraft trim tab roller control with your foot for acceleration. There was a simple ingenious safety OFF switch, using a magnet that connected two electrical terminals across a point, located close by the engine's surface watertight hatch. The rider would attach a strap to his ankle with a flexible wire line to the magnet. When he fell off, it would stop the engine.

To start it, there was a flush submerged pull start handle in the top surface of the deck by the engine hatch. Air feed to the engine was controlled by a flapper valve vent forward on the nose of the board's top surface. It sucked air in, porting it to the stern (or rear) of the craft. It was constructed of a heavy marine grade aircraft aluminum alloy to withstand the saltwater conditions it would be used in. The hull was self-bailing via a venturi effect off the grated forward water feed port, on the bottom of the board, that exhausted through the jet drive nozzle to rear for propulsion. It required routine maintenance to keep a tiny vent hole clear of seaweed or debris or the engine compartment would flood easily.

This board wasn't designed to be like a modern jet ski or later jet boards that were completely self-powered by much larger engines. The main design principal behind it was to aide a surfer in getting out through the waves, instead of laboriously paddling. This powered board also aided in times of smaller ocean waves to push them along or in order to catch faster waves without paddling. Steering was accomplished by moving your weight around on the board and leaning similar to any standard surfboard. Even with two people going to a remote access beach to launch it could be more work than paddling a normal board once in the water. In heavy wave action, you would not want this beast coming down on your head, if you fell off. So it was seldom used in rough water conditions for this reason.

With its aluminum hull and unique flat lightweight custom Tecumseh  engine and its custom Phelon ignition, this board was indeed fairly thin. It was, however, remarkably buoyant with only the engine compartment, air vent feed tube and jet tube to nozzle stern, not being filled with flotation foam. Being that this board was only around five inches thick, made it much more like its big log board, non-powered cousins. In the later model, this original engine was further modified for reliability. Originally designed from a custom single-cylinder chainsaw motor with custom water-cooled jacket design, fed by the venturi effect of the enclosed jet prop that also bailed engine compartment water out through the jet drive's stern nozzle. This also carried the exhaust gases out the rear nozzle with a preventive flap to keep water from getting into the engine, when it wasn't running.

The early mock up hulls were made of wood, but later production hulls were made by the aeronautical company Sargent Fletcher in El Monte, California.  They very expensive to build, being made of thick gauge form fabricated, marine grade alloy or modified aircraft aluminum (like a plane wing or floats on float plane) and were mostly made of custom parts. They were priced expensive because of this costly fabrication process and only saw limited manufacture of just over six hundred. Sales were mostly to elite surfers and the wealthy. Selling for almost a thousand dollars, they were over half the price of a new Volkswagen Beetle in 1965. Their initial development and production was funded by Alfred S. Bloomingdale who was said to dislike paddling and was heir to the Bloomingdale's Department store fortune).

Jetboards today

A jetboard is a motorized surfboard, where the rider controls the speed using a handheld remote control and uses the weight transfer to maneuver the board. Since the introduction of motorized surfboards a new water sport known as jet surfing has emerged.

With exceptional growth in recent years electric powered surfboards have gained popularity worldwide. By providing an enjoyable and exciting experience, Jetsurfing is an innovative addition to traditional water sports. Motorized surfboards remove the difficulties of conventional surfboards as they can be ridden without wind or waves. There is also no need for tedious paddling, as the boards can be ridden at the touch of a button. Compared to traditional surfing, jetsurfing can be easily learned and allows the user to master the sport in a short time. This makes this water sport suitable for a large audience of different physical conditions, ages, experience levels and riding styles. In addition, jetsurfing has great application potential, as it can be used on lakes, rivers, canals, seas and oceans. Therefore, they become attractive rental choices for sea lovers and adventurers. On the other hand they are also attractive "accessories" for yachts, sailing boats and catamarans.

See also
California Surf Museum

References

External links
Jetboard history
Surfboard Chainsaw Engine
Bruce Loos Aircraft and Marine Collection
Jetboarding School
Surfing equipment